Anabarilius duoyiheensis is a species of ray-finned fish in the genus Alburnus.

References

Anabarilius
Fish described in 2002